Dina Al-Erhayem (2 October 1975 – 29 December 2019) was a Danish actress with an Iraqi background.

Early life 
Al-Erhayem was raised in Gilleleje as a child of a Danish mother and an Iraqi father and had three older siblings.

Career 
Al-Erhayem graduated as an actor from Aarhus Theatre in 2003. She was a student on DR2's weekly faith magazine Univers (Universe), and in 2014 hosted the Dinas Talkshow on dk4. In December 2014, Ole Stephensen joined as host, after which the title became Dinas og Oles Talkshow.

In addition to her work as an actor and talk show host, Al-Erhayem was a singer; she released a CD titled Se min kjole (Look at My Dress). She also appeared as a stand-up comedian. Al-Erhayem's film debut was the short film Istedgade (2006) directed by Birgitte Stærmose.

Shortly before her death, Al-Erhayem talked about her religious development from atheist and Buddhist to Christian.

References

External links

Place of death missing
2019 deaths
1975 births
21st-century Danish actresses
Danish women television presenters
Danish film actresses
Danish people of Iraqi descent
People from Gribskov Municipality
Danish women comedians
Danish stand-up comedians
21st-century Danish women singers
Suicides in Denmark
2019 suicides